Conus barbara is a species of sea snail, a marine gastropod mollusk in the family Conidae, the cone snails, cone shells or cones.

These snails are predatory and venomous. They are capable of "stinging" humans.

Description
The size of the shell varies between 20 mm and 40 mm.

Distribution
This marine species occurs off Western Australia.

References

 Monnier E., Limpalaër L. & Robin A. (2013) Revision of the Pionoconus achatinus complex. Description of three new species: P. koukae n. sp. from Oman, P. arafurensis n. sp. from northern Australia and P. rouxi n. sp. from Western Australia. Xenophora Taxonomy 1: 3-39.

External links
 To World Register of Marine Species
 Cone Shells - Knights of the Sea
 

barbara
Gastropods described in 1898